Sarfannguit (old spelling: Sarfannguaq / Sarfánguaq) is a settlement in the Qeqqata municipality in central-western Greenland. Its population was 96 in 2020. The settlement was founded in 1843. The town is located within the Aasivissuit – Nipisat UNESCO World Heritage Site, inscribed on the World Heritage List in 2018 for its outstanding archeological sites representing the human occupation of Greenland for over 4000 years.

Geography 
The strait opens into the Amerloq Fjord in the west, which then heads to the west, emptying into Davis Strait south of Sisimiut. Ikertooq Fjord bounds the island from the south.

Economy 
The first wind turbine in Greenland was constructed in Sarfannguit in 2010.

Transport

Air 
The closest aerodrome is Sisimiut Airport in Sisimiut, with connections to Ilulissat, Kangerlussuaq, Maniitsoq, and Nuuk operated by Air Greenland. There are no helicopter services to coastal settlements of Davis Strait in the Qeqqata and Sermersooq municipalities. The AIP references a 20m round helipad (ICAO code: BGSA) with gravel surface at Sarfannguit.

Sea 
Royal Arctic Line provides weekly ferry services to Itilleq and Sisimiut, a port of call for the Arctic Umiaq Line, with connections to Ilulissat and Aasiaat in the Disko Bay region, and to coastal towns in southwestern and southern Greenland.

Land 
There is no road reaching Sarfannguit, but it would be connected to the proposed Sisimiut-Kangerlussuaq road, which has been discussed for several years, but not built. Snowmobiles are used in winter to connect to Sisimiut, roughly 50 km away.

Population 
The population of Sarfannguit has been stable in the last four decades.

In 1986, the leading cause of death for young people in this city was suicide.

References 

Davis Strait
Populated places in Greenland
Populated places of Arctic Greenland
Populated places established in 1843
Qeqqata
1843 establishments in Greenland